Holeylan County is in Ilam province, Iran. The capital of the county is the city of Towhid. At the 2006 census, the region's population (as Holeylan District of Chardavol County) was 15,191 in 3,066 households. The following census in 2011 counted 14,793 people in 3,696 households. At the 2016 census, the district's population was 15,276 in 4,240 households. It was separated from Chardavol County in 2020 to become Holeylan County.

Administrative divisions

The population history of Holeylan County's administrative divisions (as a district of Chardavol County) over three consecutive censuses is shown in the following table.

References

Counties of Ilam Province